Datuk Wira Dr. Mohamed Farid bin Md Rafik (Jawi: محمد فريد بن مد رفيق; ‎12 October 1976 – 21 September 2019) was a Malaysian politician who was Deputy Minister in the Prime Minister's Department in charge of national unity and social wellbeing in the Pakatan Harapan (PH) administration under former Prime Minister Mahathir Mohamad and former Minister Waytha Moorthy Ponnusamy from July 2018 and the Member of Parliament (MP) for Tanjung Piai from May 2018 to his death in September 2019. He was a member of the Malaysian United Indigenous Party (BERSATU), a former component party of the PH opposition coalition.

Background
Born in 1976, Farid hailed from Serkat, Pontian, Johor. He had his early education at Sekolah Kebangsaan (SK) Andek Mori, Serkat and secondary school later at Sekolah Menengah Sains Muzaffar Syah, Malacca before pursuing his A-Levels education at Bedford Modern School, United Kingdom (UK). He started his medical career in 2001 after graduating with a Bachelor of Medicine degree from University of Belfast, UK. In 2008, he furthered his studies to earn his anaesthesiology degree from College of Anaesthesia, Royal College of Surgeons Ireland (RCSI) and then continued to work as an anaesthesiologist in UK until 2014 before returning to Malaysia after 10 years in UK.

Politics
Prior to entering politics, he worked as an anaesthesiologist in a private hospital in Malacca. Though he was never prepared for politics, he became interested in it after his mother, Norma Mohamed who was former United Malays National Organisation (UMNO) Tanjung Piai Wanita chief, left the party in 2016 for BERSATU. His political career began when he joined BERSATU in 2017.

Farid was first elected as MP winning the Tanjung Piai parliamentary seat with a slim majority of 524 votes by defeating the then incumbent Wee Jeck Seng from the Malaysian Chinese Association (MCA) of Barisan Nasional (BN) coalition and also Nordin Othman from the Pan-Malaysian Islamic Front (BERJASA), which contested under the Pan-Malaysian Islamic Party (PAS) banner through the Gagasan Sejahtera in the 2018 general election (GE14). He was then appointed Deputy Minister in the Prime Minister's Department for National Unity and Social Harmony.

Election results

Honours
  :
  Knight Commander of the Exalted Order of Malacca (DCSM) – Datuk Wira (2018)

Death
Farid died at Hospital Pontian in Johor on 21 September 2019 of a heart attack. He was laid to rest at the Sheikh Haji Ahmad Waqf Muslim Cemetery in Kampung Chokoh, Serkat, Pontian, Johor at 5.30 pm on the same day. His funeral was attended by more than 1000 people including then-Prime Minister Mahathir Mohamad. He leaves behind a wife, Farah Syazwani Hanis Ismail, 32, and three daughters – Sophie Farissya, 8, Eva Ariaana, 4 and Zara Aleena, 2.

His death had paved the way for the 2019 Tanjung Piai by-election in which BERSATU of PH candidate had failed to defend the seat and had lost it back to his predecessor, Wee Jeck Seng of BN in the six-cornered fight for the parliamentary seat.

External links

References 

1976 births
2019 deaths
People from Johor
Malaysian people of Malay descent
Malaysian Muslims
Malaysian anaesthetists
Malaysian United Indigenous Party politicians
Members of the Dewan Rakyat
21st-century Malaysian politicians
People educated at Bedford Modern School